Ostheide is a Samtgemeinde ("collective municipality") in the district of Lüneburg, in Lower Saxony, Germany. Its seat is in the village Barendorf.

Division of the municipality
The Samtgemeinde Ostheide consists of the following municipalities:
 Barendorf
 Neetze
 Reinstorf
 Thomasburg
 Vastorf
 Wendisch Evern

References